Bettina Balàka (born 1966) is an Austrian novelist, poet, essayist, playwright and short story writer. Recent novels include Eisflüstern (The Whisper of Ice, 2006), Kassiopeia (2010) and Unter Menschen (Among People, 2014).

Biography
Born on 27 March 1966 in Salzburg, Balàka studied English and Italian at the Institut für Übersetzer- und Dolmetscherausbildung (Institute for Translation and Interpreting Studies) in Vienna, earning a master's degree in 1991. Her studies included extended trips to Britain and the United States. She has since worked as a freelance writer and translator in Vienna. In addition to her novels, poetry, drama and radio plays, Balàka has frequently contributed to literary journals and anthologies. She lives with her daughter in Vienna.

Her novel Eisflüstern, the story of a soldier returning from war, is one of the few Austrian thrillers set during the turning point of the First World War with the collapse of the Austrian Habsburgs and the establishment of a new republic. Unter Menschen is a humorous yet sad tale tracing a dog's experiences of a series of different owners. Die Prinzessin von Arborio tells how a restaurant owner who has committed three murders is interrogated by a psychologist who falls in love with her. The Austrian newspaper Kurier quotes the author's explanation: "I'm a very curious person. That's why I always look for new themes. In Die Prinzessin von Arborio I've chosen criminal psychology, hybristophilia, and falling in love as the most beautiful form of psychosis."

Awards
Balàka's many awards include the Salzburger Lyrikpreis (Salzburg Poetry Prize, 2006) und the Friedrich-Schiedel-
Literaturpreis (Friedrich Schiedel Literature Prize, 2008).

Selected publications
The following publications are all in German:
 Die dunkelste Frucht. Poetry. (Lyrik aus Österreich. Band 60). G. Grasl, Baden bei Wien 1994, .
 Krankengeschichten. Short stories, Droschl, Graz 1996, .
 Road movies. 9 Versuche aufzubrechen. Short stories. Droschl, Graz 1998, .
 Der langangehaltene Atem. Novel. Droschl, Graz 2000, .
 Messer. Essay. Droschl, Graz 2000, .
 Im Packeis. Poetry. Deuticke, Vienna 2001, .
 Dissoziationen. Gedichte aus Pflanzen und Vögeln. Poetry. Resistenz, Linz/Vienna 2002, .
 Unter Jägern. Short stories. Droschl, Graz 2002, .
 Eisflüstern. Novel. Droschl, Graz/Vienna 2006, .
 Schaumschluchten. Poetry. Droschl, Graz/Vienna 2009, .
 Auf offenem Meer. Short stories. Haymon Verlag, Innsbruck 2010, .
 Kassiopeia. Novel. Haymon Verlag, Innsbruck 2012, . (June 2012: ORF best seller list)
 Unter Menschen. Novel. Haymon Verlag, Innsbruck 2014, .
 Die Prinzessin von Arborio. Novel. Haymon Verlag, Innsbruck 2016, .

References

1966 births
Writers from Salzburg
21st-century Austrian novelists
Austrian women novelists
20th-century Austrian poets
Austrian women poets
Place of birth missing (living people)
Living people
21st-century Austrian poets
21st-century Austrian women writers
20th-century Austrian women writers